SpaceX CRS-20 (CRS-20), also known as SpaceX-20, was a Commercial Resupply Service mission to the International Space Station (ISS) launched on 7 March 2020. The mission was contracted by NASA and was flown by SpaceX using Dragon. This was SpaceX's last flight for Dragon 1 and concluded the NASA Commercial Resupply Services (CRS-1) contract extension.

The twenty (20) missions by SpaceX under the CRS-1 contract carried more than 43,000 kg (94,000 pounds) of cargo to the International Space Station, and returned about 33,000 kg (74,000 pounds) of equipment and specimens to Earth, according to NASA.
 
The second contract (CRS-2) was awarded in January 2016 and began with the  SpaceX CRS-21 in December 2020  using Dragon 2.

The Dragon capsule C112 used for CRS-20 previously flew to the ISS on CRS-10 and CRS-16. It arrived at the ISS on 9 March 2020 at 10:25 UTC and was captured by the station's Canadarm2 robotic arm, the last capture of a Dragon with Canadarm2. Cargo Dragon 2 vehicles, which will replace Dragon 1, will dock directly at the space station.

The 1st stage booster B1059 previously supported the CRS-19 mission.

Launch schedule history 
In February 2016, it was announced that NASA had awarded a contract extension to SpaceX for five CRS additional missions (CRS-16 to CRS-20). In June 2016, NASA Inspector General report had this mission manifested for 2019, but by June 2019 the launch had been pushed back to March 2020.

Payload 

NASA contracted for the CRS-20 mission from SpaceX and therefore determines the primary payload, date of launch, and orbital parameters for the Dragon CRS. The CRS-20 mission carries 1977 kg of cargo to ISS.

 Science investigations: 960 kg
 Vehicle hardware: 219 kg
 Crew supplies: 273 kg
 Spacewalk equipment: 56 kg
 Computer resources: 1 kg
 Unpressurized payloads: Bartolomeo Platform 468 kg

Bartolomeo (named for the younger brother of explorer Christopher Columbus), is an external payload platform developed by Airbus Defence and Space, German-built and operated by the European Space Agency. Bartolomeo provides power and data transmission for up to 12 payload slots and is the first external commercial research platform to be installed on the ISS.

Along with Bartolomeo, the Dragon cargo mission delivers about a ton of scientific experiments, including biological research investigations studying microgravity's impact on stem cells, intestinal diseases and chemical reactions. The Bartolomeo platform was robotically removed from Dragon's trunk section and installed outside ISS on 2 April 2020. A spacewalk to route power and communication wiring to the Bartolomeo facility for activation has been postponed. The EVA was originally planned in mid-April 2020, but the space station will not be at full staffing level of six crew members until autumn 2020. When activated, Columbus will have a new outdoor deck to host a range of materials science, Earth observation and space science instruments.

Interoperable Radio System (IORS) is the foundation element of the Amateur Radio on the International Space Station (ARISS) next-generation radio system on ISS. A total of 4 flight units and 10 total units are being built by the ARISS hardware team. The first IORS radio system shipped on CRS-20 was installed in the ISS Columbus module by Expedition 63 Commander, Chris Cassidy on 2 September 2020. System activation was first observed at 01:02 UTC on 2 September 2020 by ARISS control station and amateur radio ground operators. Initial operation of the new radio system began as an FM cross band repeater.

A second IORS flight unit is expected to be launched on a later 2020 cargo flight for installation in the Russian Service module.

ISS National Laboratory The Dragon spacecraft was also packed with spare parts and replacement hardware for the space station's research facilities and life support systems. The components included upgraded hardware for the station's urine processing system, which converts human waste into drinking water. The new components allow NASA teams to test out modifications designed to extend the lifetime of the urine processing system's distillation assembly ahead of future missions to the Moon and Mars, which will require longer-lasting life support equipment.

See also 
 Columbus – External Payload Facility
 Amateur Radio on the International Space Station
 SpaceX CRS-21
 List of Falcon 9 launches

References

External links 
 NASA
 SpaceX official page for the Dragon spacecraft
 Amateur Radio on the ISS (ARISS)
 Bartolomeo Platform – Airbus
 Bartolomeo contract

SpaceX Dragon
Spacecraft launched in 2020
SpaceX payloads contracted by NASA
Supply vehicles for the International Space Station
March 2020 events in the United States
Spacecraft which reentered in 2020